Magia Russica is an Israeli-Russian documentary film, written, directed and produced by Yonathan and Masha Zur (Yonathan & Masha Films). It depicts the untold story of Russian animation in Soviet times.
The film, released in 2004, is Yonathan and Masha Zur's first film. Magia Russica premiered at the 2004 Haifa Film Festival, and since then has been screened at 45 film festivals, animation festivals, and documentary film festivals around the globe. It was also released on DVD in the US, Japan, France, and Israel. It was broadcast in 5 different countries.

Content summary
Some of the most beautiful animations in cinema came out of Soviet Russia. Combining heartfelt moral allegory with astonishing craftsmanship, they had a power and sincerity to which much modern stuff pales. Drawing on masses of archive clips, including footage from rare classics, Magia Russica gathers surviving animators of the Soyuzmultfilm studio to give a passionate account of production under communist rule. A rich visual treat, this is also the story of the boundaries of art and ideology, and of men dedicated to magical cinema.

Participants
The film contains visits to studios and interviews with some of Russia's greatest past and current animators and animation filmmakers.
 Yuri Norstein, considered by many in the world as the best animator alive
 Fyodor Khitruk
 Garry Bardin
 Eduard Nazarov
 Aleksandr Tatarskiy
 Iosif Boyarsky

Title
The title is in Latin, and it means “Russian Magic.” It is taken from one of the main characters’ (Fyodor Khitruk) reference to animation as a sort of magic or sorcery. The filmmakers chose a Latin title since their initial intention was to expose this art form to the world outside of Russia from an outsider's point of view.

Production
The film took two years to complete. Since the initiative was completely independent, it had no sponsorship or funding from any broadcasters or funds. Yonathan and Masha Zur, who set out to film all the materials in four condensed weeks in Moscow and the surroundings in spring 2003, used the money they received as wedding presents a few months before the shooting. While shooting, Yonathan was the cameraman and the soundman, while Masha interviewed the participants. The only exception was the winter visuals of the film, which were shot by local Moscow cameraman Anton Michalev.

Reception
For a film made in an almost underground manner, Magia Russica was received warmly by different kinds of audiences around the world. It was chosen as a main program for the 2006 international ASIFA day. The film was screened in 45 film festivals, animation festivals and documentary film festivals around the globe; released on DVD in the United States, Japan, France and Israel; and broadcast in different countries (8 Channel Israel, YLE Finland, Vouli Tileorasi - Greek Parliament TV, ETV Estonia, Canal+ Poland, Telewizja Polska - TVP Poland).

References

External links
 Official Site
 Magia Russica at the Internet Movie Database
 Magia Russica in Israeli Film Center
 Magia Russica review in DVDclassik
 Magia Russica review in DVDAnime
 L'héritage de l'animation soviétique fêté et regretté au Festival d'Annecy - Magia Russica review in Le Monde, by Isabelle Regnier, 15.6.2005

2004 films
2004 documentary films
Israeli documentary films
Animated documentary films
2000s Russian-language films
Soviet art
Documentary films about the film industry
Documentary films about animation